Perumpuzha is a small suburban town in Kollam district of Kerala, India.The junction is the meeting place of Kottiyam-Kundara & Kollam-Veliyam roads. Distance from Kollam city is about 16 km.  Near to the town junction there is a market called Perumpuzha market. Assissi Attornment Hospital is just one or two minutes walk from the junction. A three-minute walk from junction towards north, a cashew factory is there. Previously it was under the Dalmia Management. The local name for the company was 'Sayippinte Company'. But now it is under CAPEX (A Kerala Govt. undertaking).

Location
The roads from junction towards south is to Kureepally, west Punukannoor, north Kundara & towards east Nallila.

History
Kundara, the nearest town is famous in history, as it was from here that Veluthampi Dalawa issued the famous Kundara Vilambaram in 1809. Large deposits of China Clay discovered here helped in the establishment of the Government Ceramics concerns. The Aluminium Industries (ALIND), Kundara is one of the leading Indian firms manufacturing aluminium cables. Kerala Electricals and Allied Engineering Company are also located in Kundara.

Education 
1. Govt. LP School, Perumpuzha
2. MGUPS, Perumpuzha
3. SN Public School
4. Noble Public School
5. Gurudeva Central School

Assissi Atonement Hospital

The Assissi Atonement Hospital was started in 1967 by Fr. Culburt OFM Cap at Perumpuzha, Kollam district, Kerala. On 1971 Benedict Mar Gregorious, Archbishop of Trivandrum, blessed the hospital. It was registered under the Travancore Cochin Literacy Scientific and Charitable Societies Registration Act 1955 on 1 November 1989.  it was run by The Congregation of Sisters of Imitation of Christ (Bethany Sisters).

Cities and towns in Kollam district